HMS Agincourt (D86) was a later or 1943  fleet destroyer of the Royal Navy. She was named in honour of the Battle of Agincourt, fought in 1415 during the Hundred Years' War. Agincourt was built by R. & W. Hawthorn, Leslie & Company Limited on the River Tyne. She was launched on 29 January 1945 and commissioned on 25 June 1947.

Service
She joined the 4th Destroyer Flotilla, part of the Home Fleet based in the UK. On 23 June 1948, Agincourt collided with the naval Motor Fishing Vessel MFV 1161, breaking off a  length of deck plating from the destroyer. In 1951, Agincourt became Captain (D), meaning she was the leader of the flotilla. On 14 July 1951, Agincourt was in collision with sister ship . A  length of planking was torn off from Agincourts port side, while Cadizs starboard anchor was damaged.

In 1953 Agincourt took part in the Fleet Review to celebrate the Coronation of Queen Elizabeth II. In December 1954, Agincourt, along with the rest of the squadron, formerly flotilla, deployed to the Mediterranean, where she was deployed until October 1955, when the Squadron returned to home waters. In 1956 Agincourt formed part of the Royal Navy force which took part in the Suez Crisis.  In 1957, Agincourt, and the 4th Destroyer Squadron, returned to the Mediterranean.

Refit and conversion to Radar Picket
In 1959, Agincourt and three of her sister-ships underwent conversion to become radar pickets. The conversion included the addition of the Sea Cat missile and new radar, as well as newer Anti-Aircraft weaponry. In 1962, Agincourt returned to active duty and saw service in the Home and Mediterranean Fleets with a variety of squadrons. On 16 November 1962 Agincourt took part in the search for a helicopter from the aircraft carrier  that had ditched off St David's Head in South west Wales (and in particular, the politician Lord Windlesham who was missing after the crash), and on the next day, was refuelling at Milford Haven when she was ordered to go to the aid of the replenishment tanker , which was in difficulty while being towed in heavy seas off Hartland Point on the coast of Devon. By the time Agincourt reached Hartland Point, Green Rangers towline had parted, and the tanker had run aground. Agincourt illuminated Green Ranger with searchlights while the Appledore lifeboat attempted to rescue the seven men aboard Green Ranger, until they were taken off by Breeches buoy from the shore.

In 1966, Agincourt was reduced to Operational Reserve, and was subsequently placed on the disposal list in 1972. She was broken up in Sunderland in 1974.

Commanding officers

References

Publications
 
 
 
 

 

Battle-class destroyers of the Royal Navy
Ships built on the River Tyne
1945 ships
Cold War destroyers of the United Kingdom